The Cadillac & Lake City Railway  was a railroad which operated in the Midwestern United States.  The operation was owned by Western States Properties, Inc. and several investors who operated lines in three states; Colorado, Kansas, and Michigan during its time.

Michigan Operations
The Cadillac & Lake City Railway began operations in 1964 over former Pennsylvania Railroad (PRR), ex:Grand Rapids and Indiana Railroad (GR&I) trackage between its namesake cities of Cadillac, Michigan, and Lake City, Michigan, .
The actual terminus for the Cadillac, Michigan end of the operation was at Missaukee Junction, Michigan, 1  mile north of Haring, Michigan where Ephraim Shay had a residence during the development of the Shay locomotive and just over 2  miles north of Cadillac, Michigan.  It was here that all traffic was transferred to and from the Pennsylvania Railroad (PRR); prior to the 1968 merger of the PRR with the New York Central (NYC); thence becoming the Penn Central (PC).  All  operations ceased in 1971, with the entire Michigan operation abandoned in September 1984 and all rail since removed.

Kansas Operations
The CLK also had trackage rights via the Union Pacific Railroad from Limon to Denver, but rarely exercised them.

Power for the CLK trains consisted of former Burlington Northern Railroad EMD F units, and Union Pacific Railroad GP7s, and former Colorado & Wyoming switchers at Colorado Springs and Denver.

Colorado Operations
In May 1984, the Limon to Colby operations were turned over to the Kyle Railroad. Power consisted of two Cleburne, Texas, rebuilt CF7s, one EMD SW1, and an ex-CMStP&P GP20. All of the Cadillac & Lake City's rail operations have since ceased with most of the tracks between Powers Boulevard (in Colorado Springs) to the Wye in Limon, Colorado being removed in the mid-1990s. There is still (2008) a lot of evidence of the former railroad simply left to rot away. Items such as an old box car just west of Marksheffel road in Colorado Springs, many telegraph poles, insulators strewn about near the old line, and the old raised grade are a common sight on the  route. A depot remains in Calhan, CO in deteriorating but rather good shape. East of Matheson, CO, a long trestle remains, where the line crosses Big Sandy Creek.

Originally Milwaukee road GP9 #2405, this unit rebuilt to GP20m and relettered for the C&LC is seen near Limon, CO in September 1984.

References 

Defunct Colorado railroads
Defunct Kansas railroads
Defunct Michigan railroads
Transportation in Wexford County, Michigan
Transportation in Missaukee County, Michigan
Companies based in Colorado Springs, Colorado